Mniusa is a genus of beetles belonging to the family Staphylinidae.

The species of this genus are found in Europe and Northern America.

Species:
 Mniusa grandiceps (Sahlberg, 1876) 
 Mniusa incrassata (Mulsant & Rey, 1851)

References

Staphylinidae
Staphylinidae genera